Allen William Mark (Doc) Coombs (23 October 1911 – 30 January 1995) was a British electronics engineer at the Post Office Research Station, Dollis Hill. 
 
Coombs was one of the principal designers of the Mark II or production version of the Colossus computer used at Bletchley Park for codebreaking in World War II, and took over leadership of the project when Tommy Flowers moved on to other projects. Professor Brian Randell was researching the history of computer science in Britain for a conference on the history of computing held at the Los Alamos National Laboratory, New Mexico on 10-15 June 1976, and got permission to present a paper on wartime development of the COLOSSI  at the Post Office Research Station,  Dollis Hill (in October 1975 the British Government released a series of captioned photographs from the Public Record Office).  The interest in the “revelations” in his paper resulted in a special evening meeting when Randell and Cooombs answered further questions. Coombs later wrote that no member of our team could ever forget the fellowship, the sense of purpose and, above all, the breathless excitement of those days. In 1977 Randell pubished an article The First Electronic Computer in several journals.  

Later at Dollis Hill Coombs worked on the MOSAIC machine. Coombs headed the scientific side of R14, the division working on optical character recognition for postal mechanisation, which moved to the new BT Research Centre at Martlesham in Suffolk. His work on pattern recognition led to the development of an early postcode-reading machine.

He frequently lectured on pattern recognition using the concept of multi-dimensional space, and the 'caltrop', and would demonstrate the presence of feature-detection in the human visual system by means of a flash gun, the persistence of vision in the audience leading them to observe disintegration of a character fragment by fragment. 'Doc' Coombs was notable for a facial 'tic', which gave him something of the appearance of the 'mad professor', and these days would probably be classed under Tourette's syndrome.

Notes

Further reading and references

External links

1911 births
1995 deaths
Bletchley Park people
British electronics engineers
Civil servants in the General Post Office
Computer hardware engineers
History of computing in the United Kingdom
20th-century British engineers